Oleksandr Isakov (born 17 October 1989, Ivano-Frankivsk) is a Ukrainian swimmer. He swam for the Ukraine in three events at the 2008 Summer Olympics, the 100 m backstroke, finishing in 38th place, the 200 m backstroke, finishing in 39th place, and the men's 4 x 100 m medley relay.  At the 2012 Summer Olympics he finished 35th overall in the heats in the Men's 100 metre backstroke and failed to reach the semifinals.  He finished in 30th position in the men's 200 m backstroke.

References

Ukrainian male backstroke swimmers
1989 births
Living people
Sportspeople from Ivano-Frankivsk
Olympic swimmers of Ukraine
Swimmers at the 2008 Summer Olympics
Swimmers at the 2012 Summer Olympics
21st-century Ukrainian people